James Lock may refer to:

 James Lock (sound engineer) (1939–2009), two-time Grammy Award winner in the area of classical music
 James Lock, early owner (from 1759), and head of James Lock & Co., hatters in London
 James Lock (TV personality), English television personality